The 1974 British Grand Prix (formally the John Player Grand Prix) was a Formula One motor race held at Brands Hatch on 20 July 1974. It was race 10 of 15 in both the 1974 World Championship of Drivers and the 1974 International Cup for Formula One Manufacturers. The 75-lap race was won by Jody Scheckter, driving a Tyrrell-Ford, with Emerson Fittipaldi second in a McLaren-Ford and Jacky Ickx third in a Lotus-Ford. Niki Lauda completed just 73 laps but was allowed an extra lap after the team protested his exit from the pit lane was blocked after a late wheel change. He initially classified ninth, but was awarded fifth place after appeal.

Classification

Qualifying

*Positions with a pink background indicate drivers that failed to qualify

Race

Championship standings after the race 

Drivers' Championship standings

Constructors' Championship standings

References

British
British Grand Prix
Grand Prix
1974 in British motorsport